Ghazala Khan (Punjabi and ; 29 October 1986 – 23 September 2005) was a Danish woman of Pakistani descent, who was shot and killed in Denmark by her brother after she had married against the will of the family. The murder of Ghazala had been ordered by her father to save the family honour, making it a so‐called honour killing. Nine people from her family took part in arranging and performing the murder and they were all found guilty by Østre Landsret (the High Court of Eastern Denmark) on 27 June 2006 on counts of murder and attempted murder (of her husband).
 
This was a ruling of historic importance, the first time in western Europe that such a large number of family members were found guilty in an "honour killing" case. It is expected that the conviction will serve as precedent throughout Europe for future similar cases and that the sentences will send a strong signal and have a noticeable deterrent effect. Manu Sareen, a youth worker helping girls facing arranged marriages said: "It will have a preventive effect. Some families may abandon similar plans because of today's ruling."

Background
Gazala Khan's father, Ghulum Abbas, originated from Punjab, Pakistan. He left Punjab in 1970.

For three years prior to her murder Ghazala had an intimate relationship with her future husband, Emal Khan. However, Ghazala, fearing her family's reaction, wished the relationship be kept secret. She eventually revealed her feelings to her mother, who became outraged and beat her, accompanied by her older brother, Akhtar Abbas, the same man who would later shoot her. Emal Khan reports that after that incident, Ghazala was locked inside the house and "frozen out" by the rest of her family, all of whom refused to speak to her or eat with her. Finally, on 5 September 2005 she managed to escape her family and live with Emal. In the period up until her murder they lived with various friends in Denmark. They repeatedly contacted the police for protection, but were denied help. On 21 September they married at the registry office of the small Danish town of Middelfart.

Attack
Two days after the wedding, the Abbas family, pretending to want to come to a peaceful reconciliation, convinced the newlywed couple to attend a meeting at the railway station in Slagelse.  There, Ghazala's brother shot both Ghazala and Emal Khan. Ghazala was killed instantly. Emal Khan, shot twice in the abdominal region, survived after a lengthy operation.

The criminal proceedings
The court case against the nine persons convicted of the murder of Ghazala was initiated on 15 May 2006. On 26 June, the court's juridical head instructed the jury that all involved could be convicted based on the evidence presented. On the 27 June, the jury found all of the indicted family members and family friends guilty of conspiracy to commit murder. On 28 June, the sentences of the nine guilt by the jury was set as follows, with permanent banishment from Denmark being ordered for all convicted persons who were not Danish citizens:

 Ghulam Abbas. Ghazala's father, 57 years old, taxi driver. Living in Denmark since 1970. Convicted of ordering the murder of Ghazala and her husband. Sentence: life in prison.
 Akhtar Abbas. Ghazala's older brother, 30 years old, taxi driver. Living in Denmark since 1986. Convicted for firing the gun that killed Ghazala and injured Emal Khan. Sentence: 16 years in prison.
 Perveen Khan. Ghazala's aunt by marriage to Ghazala's uncle Walayat Khan who was also convicted in the case, 40 years old, stay at home mother of four. Living in Denmark since 1994. Kept contact with Ghazala and Emal and informed the family, so they were found. Arranged the mock reconciliation meeting where Ghazala was murdered. Sentence: 14 years in prison followed by permanent banishment from Denmark.
 Wallayat Khan. Ghazala's uncle; mother's brother, 46 years old, taxi driver. Living in Denmark since 1987. Together with Ghazala's father, sought out several of the people who had helped to hide Ghazala and Emal. Was in Ringsted at the time of the murder, and followed the action on his cell phone. Sentence: 16 years.
 Asghar Ali (the elder). Ghazala' uncle; father's brother, 42 years old, taxi driver. Living in Denmark since 1987. Together with Ghazala's father, sought out several of the people who had helped to hide Ghazala and Emal. Was in Ringsted at the time of the murder, and followed the action on his cell phone. Sentence: 16 years.
 Asghar Ali (the younger). Ghazala's uncle; father's brother, 31 years old, unemployed. Living in Denmark since 2001. Drove in the car with Ghazala's brother on his way to the murder. Had experienced alcohol and drug related problems. In the days following the murder, he was heard bragging about what the family had done. Sentence: 14 years followed by permanent banishment from Denmark.
 Anser Iqbal. Friend of family, 45 years old, taxi driver. Living in Denmark since 1976. Accompanied Ghazala's aunt to the mock reconciliation meeting. Stayed in constant phone contact with the rest of the convicted which were also at or around the scene of the murder. Sentence: 10 years.
 Naweed Sharif. Friend of family, 30 years old, taxi driver. Born in Denmark. Drove Ghazala's brother on his way to the murder. Sentence: 8 years.
 Ghulam Ahmed. Friend of family, 36 years old, taxi driver. Living in Denmark since 1987. Knew of the plans to murder Ghazala. Was in the car that drove Ghazala's brother to Ghazala. Sentence: 10 years followed by permanent banishment from Denmark.

See also
Honour killings of people of Pakistani heritage outside of Pakistan
 Shafilea Ahmed (United Kingdom)
 Sandeela Kanwal (United States)
 Samaira Nazir (United Kingdom)
 Aqsa Parvez (Canada)
 Hina Saleem (Italy)
 Sadia Sheikh (Belgium)

References

External links

 Family Sentenced for 'Honor Killing' of Woman, Ms. magazine, 30 June 2006. Last accessed 27 July 2006.
 Jail for Denmark 'honour' killing, BBC News, 29 June 2006. Last accessed 27 July 2006.

1987 births
2005 deaths
Honor killing in Europe
Honor killing victims
Danish murder victims
Deaths by firearm in Denmark
Danish Muslims
Danish people of Pakistani descent
Pakistani people murdered abroad
People murdered in Denmark
2005 murders in Denmark
Sororicides